Eumorpha neuburgeri is a moth of the  family Sphingidae. It is known from Argentina and Bolivia.

The wingspan is 98–106 mm. The outer margin of the forewing is slightly crenulated. The forewing upperside is most similar to Eumorpha anchemolus and Eumorpha triangulum but distinguishable from both by the more-or-less parallel-sided dorsal abdominal band..

Adults have been recorded in late November early December in Argentina.

References

Eumorpha
Moths described in 1903